
Year 82 BC was a year of the pre-Julian Roman calendar. At the time it was known as the Year of the Consulship of Marius and Carbo (or, less frequently, year 672 Ab urbe condita). The denomination 82 BC for this year has been used since the early medieval period, when the Anno Domini calendar era became the prevalent method in Europe for naming years.

Events 
 By place 

 Roman Republic 
 Sulla defeats Samnite allies of Rome in the Battle of the Colline Gate, and takes control of Rome.
 Gaius Marius the Younger is besieged at the fortress city of Praeneste in Latium. After a fierce resistance, Marius commits suicide.
 Pompey is ordered by Sulla to stamp out Marian rebels in Sicily and Africa, while the young Gaius Julius Caesar is acting as a subordinate of Sulla in the east.
 After his campaigns in Sicily and Africa, Pompeius gets the insulting nickname of adulescentulus carnifex, the "teenage butcher".
 Lucius Licinius Murena launches a raid against Pontus in the Battle of Halys, starting the Second Mithridatic War.

 Dacia 
 Burebista unifies the Dacian population forming the first (and biggest) unified Dacian Kingdom, on the territory of modern Romania and surroundings. 82 BC is also the starting year of his reign.

 By topic 

 Astronomy 
 The Aurigid shower parent comet C/1911 N1 (Kiess) returns to the inner solar system and sheds the dust particles that one revolution later cause the 1935, 1986, 1994, and 2007 Aurigid meteor outbursts on Earth.

Births 
 May 28 – Licinius Macer Calvus, Roman orator and poet (d. c. 47 BC)
 Marcus Caelius Rufus, Roman orator and politician (d. c. 48 BC)
 Varro Atacinus, Roman poet and writer (d. c. 35 BC)
 Vercingetorix, Gaul warrior and leader (d. 46 BC)

Deaths 
 Antiochus XII Dionysus, king of the Seleucid Empire (killed in battle)
 Gaius Carrinas, Roman politician and general (executed by order of Sulla)
 Gaius Fabius Hadrianus, Roman politician and governor
 Gaius Marcius Censorinus, Roman politician and general (executed by order of Sulla)
 Gaius Marius the Younger, Roman politician (commits suicide)
 Gaius Norbanus, Roman consul and governor (commits suicide)
 Gnaeus Papirius Carbo, Roman consul (executed by order of Sulla)
 Marcus Marius Gratidianus, Roman praetor and politician (executed by order of Sulla)
 Quintus Mucius Scaevola Pontifex, Roman consul (murdered by order of Marius the Younger)
 Quintus Valerius Soranus, Roman politician and Latin poet (executed by order of Sulla)

References